The Kiral are a very small Durrani Pashtun tribe located in Maruf district, Kandahar province. Affiliation with larger tribe or tribal confederation is unknown.

Sources
Kandahar Province, Center for Culture and Conflict Studies, US Naval Postgraduate School.

Durrani Pashtun tribes
Ethnic groups in Kandahar Province